The women's 400 metres event at the 2017 European Athletics Indoor Championships was held on 3 March 2017 at 9:45 (heats), at 17:45 (semifinals) and on 4 March 19:58 (final) local time.

Medalists

Records

Results

Heats
Qualification: First 2 in each heat (Q) and the next 6 fastest (q) advance to the Semifinal.

Semifinals
Qualification: First 2 in each heat (Q) advance to the Final.

Final

References

2017 European Athletics Indoor Championships
400 metres at the European Athletics Indoor Championships